Zhang Fengzhong (born 8 March 1966) is a major general in the People's Liberation Army of China.

He is a representative of the 20th National Congress of the Chinese Communist Party and an alternate member of the 20th Central Committee of the Chinese Communist Party.

Biography
Zhang was born in Xinyi County (now Xinyi), Jiangsu, on 8 March 1966, to Zhang Shilun and Su Yulian. He is the third of five children. In 1984, he entered the Second Artillery Force Engineering Academy and also graduated from the PLA National Defence University.

He enlisted in the People's Liberation Army (PLA) in September 1984, and joined the Chinese Communist Party (CCP) in June 1989. He was director of the Political Department of the 53 Rocket Force Base before serving as political commissar of Rocket Army Base 51 in July 2016. He was political commissar of the 65th Rocket Army Base in March 2017 and subsequently political commissar of the 66th Rocket Army Base in March 2019.

On 1 October 2019, he led the rocket military team to participate in the military parade of Celebrating the 70th Anniversary of the Founding of the People's Republic of China.

He was promoted to the rank of major general (shaojiang) in July 2017.

References

1966 births
Living people
PLA National Defence University alumni
People's Liberation Army generals from Jiangsu
People's Republic of China politicians from Jiangsu
Chinese Communist Party politicians from Jiangsu
Alternate members of the 20th Central Committee of the Chinese Communist Party